The 2015–16 NWHL season is the first season of operation of the National Women's Hockey League. Four teams competed for the inaugural Isobel Cup: the Boston Pride, Buffalo Beauts, New York Riveters, and Connecticut Whale.

League business  
 July 2015: The NWHL Foundation hosted a Canadian Training Camp Series in four different Canadian cities (Montreal, Ottawa, Toronto, Windsor).
Late July 2015: A training camp for European players took place at Ristuccia Memorial Arena outside Boston on July 23, hosted by Boston Pride head coach Bobby Jay. Players from Switzerland, Sweden, Finland, Germany and Japan attended.

All-star game

The 1st NWHL All-Star Game was held January 24, 2016 at HarborCenter in Buffalo, the home of the Beauts.

Regular season

Standings

Schedule

All times in Eastern Standard Time (UTC−05:00).

Playoffs

Statistics

Scoring leaders
The following players led the league in regular season points at the conclusion of season.

Milestones

Awards and honors
 Brianna Decker, Boston Pride, 2016 NWHL Most Valuable Player
 Hilary Knight, Boston Pride, 2016 NWHL Scoring Champion
 Denna Laing, Boston Pride, 2016 NWHL Perseverance Award
 Denna Laing, Boston Pride, 2016 NWHL Foundation Award
 Gigi Marvin, Boston Pride, 2016 NWHL Defensive Player of the Year Award
 Brittany Ott, Boston Pride, 2016 NWHL Goaltender of the Year

Transactions

NWHL draft
The 2015 NWHL draft took place in Boston on June 22, 2015. The draft was not binding on the players, who did not enter their names and did not have to give their consent. It was not clear that the players felt themselves bound by the decisions made in the draft. However, during the season the NWHL was frequently active on social media about draft picks' success in the NCAA, and on April 1, 2016 the NWHL announced  that the draft would be enforced insofar as there would be salary cap penalties for teams that signed other teams' draftees.

A draft lottery was held by NWHL commissioner Dani Rylan, with the New York Riveters earning the first pick overall.

Notable first round picks included University of Minnesota forward Hannah Brandt by Connecticut, Northeastern University forward Kendall Coyne by Boston, and University of Wisconsin defenseman Courtney Burke by Buffalo.

Free agency

Trades

References

Gamesheets

External links

 

 
1